Chitre Bhanjyang  is a village development committee in Syangja District, in the Gandaki Zone of central Nepal. At the time of the 2011 Nepal census, it had a population of 3551 people living in 813 individual households.

References

External links
UN map of the municipalities of Syangja District

Populated places in Syangja District